This is a list of Renaissance faires and other Medieval-themed faires worldwide.

North America

United States
Included below are the permanent-site fairs in the United States which are either notably long running, which regularly have had at least a two-week or better run; and have had at least a five years continuing run.  Generally, U.S. renaissance fairs are open weekends-only during the periods indicated.  States are listed first and dates are codified to facilitate searching by state and by date.

† Permanent = mostly permanent, purpose-built structures at stable location;  Semi-permanent = may feature a few permanent purpose-built structures at a stable location;  Repeating = event occurs regularly but with no permanent, purpose-built structures and/or at changing location(s)

Canada
Most Canadian events are only one weekend in duration.  Those notable and older than 10 years are listed here.

Australia and New Zealand
Most Australian events are only one or two days in duration.  Notable Renaissance and Medieval events (older than 10 years) are listed here.

South Africa

Europe

United Kingdom

Italy

Germany

Elsewhere in Europe

See also 
 List of open air and living history museums in the United States
 List of tourist attractions worldwide
 Medieval Times
 Medieval Faire (Canada's Wonderland)

References

External links 
 U.S. Renaissance faires by state at RenFaire.com
 Up-to-date listing of Medieval faires around the world
 Up-to-date listing of Renaissance faires and festivals in the United States

 
 
Lists of events
Entertainment lists
Lists of festivals by topic
Renn